The 2010 Greek local elections were held on 7 November 2010 (first round) and 14 November 2010 (second round) to elect representatives to Greece's restructured local authorities, comprising 13 regions and 325 municipalities.

Background
Traditionally, candidates at local elections do not run under the official name of any party as the constitution only foresees the participation of electoral lists (or "combinations") and not parties. Despite this theoretical independence and distinction, for all practical purposes most candidates run as local front organisations for political parties.

The election also comes at a time of increasing unrest in Greece following numerous bombs being sent to foreign embassies, as well protests against austerity measures forced by the EU and IMF in order for Greece to receive external financial support.

Issues
With the economy being touted as the mandate sought in the election Prime Minister George Papandreou said he would dissolve the national parliament should the candidates of his Panhellenic Socialist Movement (PASOK) fail to win an unspecified threshold. "Citizens will decide in today's election if we will hold steady on the path of salvation... or if we will go back to decay and to the Greece of bankruptcy."

Election results

Major municipalities
In the municipalities, as well as the regions, any candidate can participate in the first round. If the leading candidate doesn't have the required 50%+1 of the votes, then a second round is held between the two leading candidates of the first round.

Athens

Thessaloniki

Heraklion

Patras

Piraeus

Peristeri

Regions
Source: Hellenic Ministry of the Interior

Attica

Notes:
† Ioannis Dimaras was elected a parliament member with Panhellenic Socialist Movement in the National Elections of 2009.

§ Alexios Mitropoulos is a member of the National Council of the Panhellenic Socialist Movement.

‡ Alekos Alavanos is a prominent member of the Coalition of Radical Left, and although his party didn't support him officially, some fractions such as KOE, DEA and KEDA did.

Central Greece

Central Macedonia

Crete

Notes:
† Dimitrios Giannoulakis was independent at the time of the elections, but was supported by Dora Bakoyannis and is closely related to her newly founded Democratic Alliance party

Eastern Macedonia and Thrace

Epirus

Ionian Islands

North Aegean

Peloponnese

South Aegean

Thessaly

West Greece

West Macedonia

National summary

Councils and Councillors of the regions

Nationwide percentage results

Reaction
The government saw its share of vote drop by 9% but it remained the largest party. Prime Minister Papandreou said that he would continue with tough austerity measures to alleviate Greece's debt burden following a narrow victory in the election.

References

Local elections in Greece
2010 elections in Greece
2010 in Greek politics
November 2010 events in Europe